Ian Truitner is an American filmmaker and entrepreneur.

Biography 
Truitner studied at the University of Minnesota and Penn State University. He was awarded Alumni of Notable Achievement by the University of Minnesota in 2017. Truitner is a U.S. Army veteran, serving during Operation Desert Storm.

As a filmmaker Truitner's work includes Cutting Room, W.M.D. and Teleios. Teleios earned him the Best Director award at the American Movie Awards.

In 2015 Truitner was granted a U.S. patent on a streaming media bookmarking, cataloging and purchasing system for RANDIAN, a company he co-founded with Randall Scerbo Truitner, which was funded by Amanda Crew, Marc Ferrari, New York-based R&R Ventures, William Marsh Rice University and Quake Capital. He presented RANDIAN technology to Prince William and Catherine, Duchess of Cambridge at the Variety Venture Capital and New Media Summit.

A member of the Directors Guild of America, Truitner was a panelist at the 2016 C3 Visual Communications DGA: Utilizing Emerging Technology to Enhance Your Storytelling Panel and was a Guest of Honor at science-fiction convention CONvergence in 2017.

In May 2020 Truitner directed a campaign to raise funds for the American Nurses Association's philanthropic arm the American Nurses Foundation. The spot featuring Rita Wilson, Constance Wu, Noah Wyle, Kate Flannery, Joan Lunden, Angelica Maria, Parminder Nagra and Simon Helberg was created to raise funds for nurses treating COVID-19 patients.

Credits

References

External links 

 

Film directors from Minnesota
Living people
1972 births
University of Minnesota alumni
Smeal College of Business alumni